Mabel Cook Cole (April 18, 1880 – November 13, 1977) was an American writer and anthropologist. She specialized in the study of ancient man and in studying the people of the Philippines. Her books include The Story of Primitive Man, The Story of Man, Savage Gentleman, and Philippine Folk Tales.

References 
 
United States Census Records; California Death Index; Kendall County, IL, Birth Records; Kendall County, IL, Cemetery Records; The Book of Chicagoans, 1917 Edition; Kendall County Teachers Institute Attendees List; Woman's Club Yearbook, 1904–1914, and 1925–1927 (also spoke there a number of times); The Plano Record, October 10, 1906 and December 13, 1933; Scrapbook of Obituaries; The Kendall County News, September 29, 1920; Plano Community Library Scrapbook; and personal research and family traditions of Kristy Lawrie Gravlin.

External links
 
 
 

American women anthropologists
People from Plano, Illinois
1880 births
1977 deaths
20th-century American women scientists
20th-century American scientists
20th-century American anthropologists